Douglas LeAllen Williams (born September 3, 1956) is an American music artist. He started his solo music career, in 1995, with the release of gospel album, Heartsongs, that was released by Blackberry Records. The album got him a Grammy Award nomination at the 38th Annual Grammy Awards for the Best Contemporary R&B Gospel Album. His second album, When Mercy Found Me, was released in 2003, with the backing of Blackberry Records releasing the project. His third album, Good Graces, was released in 2005 by Orchard Records. The first two of these album charted on the Billboard Gospel Albums chart.

Early life
Williams was born on September 3, 1956, in Smithdale, Mississippi, as Douglas LeAllen Williams, the son of Leon "Pop" Williams (1908/1909 – 1989), he died in a car accident, and Amanda "Mom" Williams (b:1919 – D:August 30, 2014), she died at the age of 94. He is the youngest sibling and younger brother of Melvin Williams, and the late Franklin Delano Williams.

Music career
He is one part of The Williams Brothers, that was founded in 1960 by his father. He started his solo music career in 1995, with the release of Heartsongs by Blackberry Records, which charted at No. 16 on the Billboard Gospel Albums chart. This album got him a Grammy Award nomination in the Best Contemporary R&B Gospel Album category at the 38th Annual Grammy Awards. His second album, 2003's When Mercy Found Me, was released by Blackberry Records on January 21, 2003, and this would chart on the Gospel Albums chart at No. 28. Trevor Kirk, indicating in a seven out of ten review by Cross Rhythms, realizes, it is "Very enjoyable." The third album came out on October 25, 2005 by Orchard Records, Good Graces, and this failed to chart. Doug continues to live in Mississippi, where he serves as President & Chief Executive Officer of Blackberry Records, Inc., the Williams Brothers’ record label in McComb, Miss.

Discography

References

External links
 id=160|Official website
 Doug Williams Interview NAMM Oral History Library (2019)

1956 births
Living people
African-American songwriters
African-American Christians
Musicians from Mississippi
Songwriters from Mississippi
21st-century African-American people
20th-century African-American people